= 400ER =

400ER may refer to:

- Boeing 747-400ER, aircraft variant
- Boeing 767-400ER, aircraft variant
